Ad Parnassum is a pointillist painting by Swiss-born artist Paul Klee. The painting is currently in the Kunstmuseum Bern.

Analysis
It was created while Klee was teaching at the Dusseldorf Academy following his trip to Egypt three years prior. The painting process consisted of first applying large squares of muted color on unprimed canvas. Klee then stamped on smaller squares, first in white and then in other diluted colors. The composition is dominated by the shape of a pyramid outlined with stamped lines. The structure could also be interpreted as the roof of a house or a mountain and was likely inspired by the Egyptian pyramids, the Niesen that overlooks Lake Thun in the artist's home country, and the titular Mount Parnassus. Above the pyramid to the right is a bright orange circle that represents the Sun.

Ad Parnassum was painted during a turning point in Klee's artistic style and is now considered a masterpiece in pointillism. An exhibition celebrating the work was presented at the Zentrum Paul Klee from June 2007 to May 2008.

See also
List of works by Paul Klee

References

External links

Paintings by Paul Klee
1932 paintings
Sun in art
Pointillism
Paintings in Bern